Wade Hampton may refer to the following people:

People
Wade Hampton I (1752–1835), American soldier in Revolutionary War and War of 1812 and U.S. congressman
Wade Hampton II (1791–1858), American plantation owner and soldier in War of 1812
Wade Hampton III (1818–1902), American Civil War soldier and politician; elected Governor and Senator of South Carolina, opponent of Reconstruction
William Wade Hampton (1854–1928), Florida lawyer commonly known as Wade Hampton
Wade Hampton Frost (1880-1938), professor of epidemiology
Wade Randolph Hampton, an American DJ active since the mid-1990s

Places
Kusilvak Census Area, Alaska, formerly Wade Hampton Census Area
Wade Hampton, South Carolina
Wade Hampton Boulevard